Marlboro is an unincorporated community in Stark County, Ohio, United States.

Demographics

History
Marlboro was laid out in 1827, taking its name from Marlboro Township. The community was originally built up chiefly by Quakers. By 1833, Marlborough had about 50 inhabitants. A post office called Marlborough was established in 1833, the name was changed to Marlboro in 1893, and the post office closed in 1906.

Notable people
Thomas Corwin Mendenhall, Physicist.
Walter Curran Mendenhall, Geologist.

Notes

Unincorporated communities in Stark County, Ohio
Unincorporated communities in Ohio